Augusta is an unincorporated community situated on the Skunk River in Des Moines County, Iowa, United States. It is located 10 miles southwest of Burlington and nine miles north of Fort Madison, off U.S. Route 61 and Iowa Highway 16. The community is part of the Burlington, IA–IL Micropolitan Statistical Area.

Demographics

History
 In 1835, Levi Moffitt, one of the first settlers, built the first water-power "flouring" mill in the state of Iowa. In 1842, Moffitt and Dan Jones built a church in Augusta, and helped to transport immigrants up the river to Nauvoo.  The means of travel was a small steamboat that was called the Maid of Iowa, which was captained by Dan Jones.

The Augusta Academy, a co-educational institution, was established in Augusta in January 1839. This was followed by the Augusta Literary and Debating Society, founded in 1879. 

The first postmaster of Augusta was Joshua Holland, appointed on October 2, 1846.

Augusta's population was 163 in 1902, and 110 in 1925.

References

Unincorporated communities in Iowa
Unincorporated communities in Des Moines County, Iowa
Burlington, Iowa micropolitan area